The Third Charm is a 2018 South Korean television series directed by Pyo Min-soo and starring Seo Kang-joon and Esom. It explores the real side of relationships between couples. It aired from September 28 to November 17, 2018, on JTBC's Fridays and Saturdays at 23:00 (KST) time slot.

Synopsis
A romantic comedy that follows the realistic romance of two individuals with completely opposite personalities who unexpectedly met on a group blind date.

On Joon-young (Seo Kang-joon) is a 20-year-old university student. He is a neat, good student, wearing unassuming glasses, jeans, white socks and white sneakers. He does not care about fashion. He plans more than necessary and is very sensitive. Joon-young then takes part in his first blind date. There, he meets Young-jae and they begin to date.

Lee Young-jae (Esom), who is also 20-years-old, is emotional, spontaneous and honest. She does not have parents, but she is really close to her older brother. They live together and rely on each other. Her dream is to become rich and she decided to work as a hairdresser's assistant rather than going to a university. A friend then dragged her to a blind meeting with a university student. There, she meets Joon-young who has a totally different personality from her.

Cast

Main
 Seo Kang-joon as On Joon-young, a meticulous and principled university student who never deviates from his perfectly scheduled routines.
 Esom as Lee Young-jae, a spontaneous and emotional but honest woman who gave up college and started working as an assistant hairdresser.

Supporting
 Yang Dong-geun as Lee Dong-jae, Young-jae's brother. A barista who runs a coffee truck and dreams of becoming a screenwriter.
 Lee Yoon-ji as Baek Joo-ran, boss of the hair salon where Young-jae works.
 Min Woo-hyuk as Choi Ho-chul, a talented plastic surgeon who has a crush on Young-jae.
 Kim Yoon-hye as Min Se-eun, a police officer who likes Joon-young.
 Lee Sang-yi as Hyun Sang-hyun, Joon-young's best friend.
 Park Gyu-young as On Ri-won, Joon-young's younger sister.
 Shin Do-hyun as Kim So-hee, a top star loved by many due to her beautiful appearance. She is Young-jae's high school alumnus and rival.
 Oh Young-sil as Joon-young's mother
 Yang Dae-hyuk as Joo Kwang-ho	
 Park Ji-il as Joon-young's father
 Bang Jae-ho as Jae-woo
 Lee Chung-mi as Mi-young	
 Han Byul as Dong-goo, Joon-young's close friend.

Production
 The female lead role was first offered to Chun Woo-hee and Choi Soo-young in April and May 2018 respectively, but both actresses declined the offer.
 The first script reading was held in July 2018 at JTBC building in Sangam-dong, Seoul.
 Overseas filming took place in several cities in Portugal.

Original soundtrack

Part 1

Part 2

Part 3

Part 4

Part 5

Part 6

Part 7

Viewership

References

External links
  
 
 

Korean-language television shows
JTBC television dramas
2018 South Korean television series debuts
2018 South Korean television series endings
South Korean romantic comedy television series
Television series by JYP Entertainment
Television series by Imagine Asia